Yves Bonnet (born 20 November 1935) is a senior French civil servant and politician. He was prefect and director of the DST from 1982 to 1985. A member of the UDF, he served as deputy for the unified party from 1993 to 1997, before joining the National Rally during the regional elections of 2021.

Early life 
Yves Bonnet was born on November 20, 1935, in Chartres, France. He is the son of Henri Bonnet, Diplomat and former mayor of Châteaudun. Yves Bonnet lived his childhood in this city, doing all his schooling there. He studied political science and graduated from the Paris Institute of Political Studies in the late 1950s. During the Algerian war, he was an officer of the contingent.

Career 
He joined the prefectural body in 1958. Sub-prefect of La Trinité from 1968 to 1970, Arles from 1974 to 1976, Cherbourg (1976-1978) and of Dunkirk (1978-1981), he was then appointed prefect of Mayotte between January and of November 1982 and was appointed by President François Mitterrand Director of the Direction de la surveillance du territoire.

As such, he took over the Farewell affair initiated by his predecessor Marcel Chalet. He advised the president to expel the intelligence officers from the Russian embassy in France, which is validated by Mitterrand. He is responsible for dismantling several terrorist networks. He also initiated relations with several Arab security and intelligence services, including Algerian Military Security, and doubled the number of foreign liaisons. It computerizes the central file of the DST.

He was appointed prefect of Finistère on August 1, 1985, then prefect of the Guadeloupe region after the legislative elections of March 1986. He put an end to the activities of the independence organizations and had the members of the Caribbean Revolutionary Army (ARC) arrested. Guadeloupe then found the highest growth rate of the overseas departments.

He became prefect of the Marne department and the Champagne-Ardenne region in 1987. He was one of the initiators of the re-opening of Vatry airport and the promoter of partnerships with several regions of eastern countries (the CEEC) notably those of Oryol (in USSR), Toruń (in Poland), Piatra Neamț (in Romania), Košice (in Slovakia) and Schwerin (Mecklenburg-Vorpommern).

Yves Bonnet left his post as regional prefect to establish himself politically in Cherbourg, where he was an opposition municipal councilor representing the UDF.

He was the MP for Manche's 5th constituency between 1993 and 1997. In the National Assembly, he was a member of the National Defence and Armed Forces Committee as well as rapporteur for the navy budget.

In 2021, he joined the National Rally during the French regional elections on the list led by Nicolas Bay.

Works 
He is the author of numerous books, ranging from investigative documents to spy novels, and regularly speaks in the press about Iranian and Middle Eastern issues and terrorism.

 La Liberté surveillée, Thésaurus, 1993
 La Trahison des ayatollahs, Jean Picollec, 1995
 Mission ou Démission, Jean Picollec, 1996
 Contre-espionnage, mémoires d'un patron de la DST, Calmann-Lévy, 1998
 Lettre à une Algérienne, La Boite à documents, 1998
 De qui se moquent-ils ?, Flammarion, 2001
 La Cour des miracles, Flammarion, 2002
 Impondérables, Calmann-Lévy, 2003, thriller
 Top Secret, Timée Éditions, 2006
 Les Veuves blanches, La société des écrivains, 2006, roman
 Tube, Éditions Des Idées & Des Hommes, avril 2007, thriller
 Nucléaire iranien, une hypocrisie internationale, Michel Lafon, 2008
 Liban : les otages du mensonge, Michel Lafon, 2008
 Vevak, au service des ayatollahs, Timée Éditions, April 2009
 Gaza, au cœur de la tragédieavec Albert Farhat, Timée Éditions, June 2009
 Le Grand Complot, Jean-Claude Gawsewitch Éditeur, 544 pages, 2012
 Le berger de Touggourt, Vérités sur les moines de Tibhirine, 2016
 La deuxième guerre d'Algérie, VA éditions, March 2017

References 

1935 births
Writers from Chartres
Sciences Po alumni
Prefects of Guadeloupe
Prefects of Mayotte
Prefects of Finistère
Prefects of Marne (department)
Deputies of the 10th National Assembly of the French Fifth Republic
People of the Algerian War
Union for French Democracy politicians
Living people